
Gmina Waganiec is a rural gmina (administrative district) in Aleksandrów County, Kuyavian-Pomeranian Voivodeship, in north-central Poland.

Villages
Gmina Waganiec contains the villages and settlements of Ariany, Bertowo, Brudnowo, Byzie, Ciupkowo, Janowo, Józefowo, Kaźmierzyn, Kolonia Święte, Konstantynowo, Lewin, Michalin, Niszczewy, Nowy Zbrachlin, Plebanka, Przypust, Sierzchowo, Siutkowo, Śliwkowo, Stannowo, Stary Zbrachlin, Szpitalka, Waganiec, Wiktoryn, Włoszyca, Wójtówka, Wólne, Zakrzewo and Zbrachlin.

Neighbouring gminas
Gmina Waganiec is bordered by the town of Nieszawa and by the gminas of Bądkowo, Bobrowniki, Koneck, Lubanie and Raciążek.

References
Polish official population figures 2006

Waganiec
Aleksandrów County